The One is a British science fiction television series based on John Marrs's 2016 novel of the same name. It was created by Howard Overman and was released on Netflix on 12 March 2021.

Cast and characters
 Hannah Ware as Rebecca Webb
 Dimitri Leonidas as James Whiting
 Amir El-Masry as Ben Naser
 Stephen Campbell Moore as Damien Brown
 Wilf Scolding as Ethan
 Diarmaid Murtagh as Connor Martin
 Lois Chimimba as Hannah Bailey
 Eric Kofi-Abrefa as Mark Bailey
 Pallavi Sharda as Megan Chapman
 Zoe Tapper as Kate Saunders
 Albano Jerónimo as Matheus Silva
 Gregg Chillin as Nick Gedny
 Nadia Albina as Amy Naser
 Simone Kirby as Charlotte Driscoll
 Laura Aikman as Lucy Bell

Production
On 15 November 2018, it was announced that Netflix had given the production a series order for a first series consisting of eight episodes. The series was created by Howard Overman.

Reception
Review aggregator Rotten Tomatoes reported an approval rating of 44% based on 16 reviews, with an average rating of 5.33/10. The website's critics consensus reads, "Too much plot and not enough resolve let The One down, but its fun and flashy thrills may be enough to keep viewers entertained - at least for a little while." Metacritic reported a weighted average score for the series of 51 out of 100 based on 9 reviews, indicating "mixed or average reviews".

Episodes

References

External links

2021 British television series debuts
2021 British television series endings
2020s British drama television series
2020s British science fiction television series
2020s British television miniseries
English-language Netflix original programming
Television shows based on British novels
Television series by StudioCanal